Rauf Salifu (born 23 April 2002) is a Ghanaian professional footballer who plays as a striker for Malaysia Super League club Selangor.

Club career

Accra Lions
Born in Accra, Salifu played for Accra Lions in his homeland. He was part of the club to win the title in the 2020–21 Ghana Division One and ended up as top scorer the seasons Division One with 21 goals. Also, Salifu help the club earned promotion to the Ghana Premier League next season. After that, he received interest from clubs in Belgium, Turkey, Spain, and the Middle East.

Sporting Kansas City II
On 7 February 2022, Salifu moving abroad to United States and joining Sporting Kansas City II on loan. He made his debut on 28 March with playing 58 minutes of the 1–1 away draw against Colorado Rapids II. He scored his first goal later on 5 June 2022, however, his side lose point in the match against Minnesota United II. On 3 July 2022, Salifu was named Man of the Match when he scored all four goals in a tight match against North Texas at home, which ended 4–2 with his club emerging victorious. It was the first time Salifu had scored four goals in one match in his entire career. Overall, he scored 6 goals and provided one assist in 17 appearances for the club.

Selangor
On 20 January 2023, Salifu was signed by Malaysia Super League club Selangor on a permanent deal.

Career statistics

Club

Honours
Accra Lions
 Ghana Division One: 2020–2021

References

External links
 

2002 births
Living people
Ghanaian footballers
Association football forwards
MLS Next Pro players
Sporting Kansas City II players
Footballers from Accra